A list of Bangladeshi films released in 1968.

Released films

See also

 1968 in Bangladesh
 List of Bangladeshi films

References

External links 
 Bangladeshi films on Internet Movie Database

Bangladesh
Lists of Pakistani Bengali films by year